Reid & Compania is composed of several companies engaged in the distribution of  brands in the automotive and heavy equipment industries in the Dominican Republic such as Jeep, Chrysler, Dodge, RAM, Komatsu, Wanco, among others.

History 
Reid & Compañía, S.A., established in 1947 as Reid & Pellerano, C. por A., is the parent company of Grupo ReidCo and was founded by Donald J. Reid Cabral and Rogelio A. Pellerano Romano. Today, Grupo ReidCo remains in the hands of the Reid family.

Subsidiaries 
The main companies of Grupo ReidCo are:
 Reid & Compañía - Exclusive distributor and service of automotive brands Jeep, Chrysler, Dodge, RAM and Maserati in Dominican Republic. Also Heavy Equipment manufacturers Komatsu.
 Autocamiones - Exclusive distributor of automotive brand Isuzu in Dominican Republic.
 Agencias Generales
 ReidCo Corporación de Crédito

Brands 

The brands represented by Grupo ReidCo include:

Chrysler
Jeep
Dodge
RAM
SRT
Mopar
Maserati
GEM
Daihatsu
Isuzu
Komatsu
Komatsu Forklift
Dynapac
KMP Brand / Diesel Guard Brand
Total Lubricants
Bridgestone - Firestone
Tennant
Sakai
 JLG
Wynn's
Rhino Linings
Wanco

References 

Automotive companies of the Dominican Republic